I Did It is a 1909 American silent short drama film directed by D. W. Griffith.

Cast
 Adele DeGarde as Gladys, The Little Girl
 Anita Hendrie as The Mother
 Linda Arvidson as A Visitor
 Gladys Egan as The Little Boy
 Arthur V. Johnson 
 Florence Lawrence
 Dorothy West as The Maid

References

External links
 

1909 films
1909 drama films
1909 short films
Silent American drama films
American silent short films
American black-and-white films
Films directed by D. W. Griffith
1900s American films